The Morewood massacre was an armed labor-union conflict in Morewood, Pennsylvania, in Westmoreland County, west of the present-day borough Mount Pleasant in 1891.

Casualties and causes  

Nine coke workers were shot and killed during a strike for higher wages and an eight-hour work day.

The United Mine Workers union, formed only the previous year, organized the strike against the local coke works owned by industrialist Henry Clay Frick. After a work stoppage beginning on February 10, weeks of increasing unrest, and evictions of mining families from company-controlled property, a crowd of about a thousand strikers accompanied by a brass band marched on the company store.  Deputized members of the 10th regiment of the National Guard under the command of Captain Loar fired several volleys  into the crowd, killing six strikers outright and fatally wounding three more.  Thousands attended their funeral.

A Pennsylvania state historical marker describing the Morewood event was erected in 2000 on Route 981 (Morewood Road) near the Route 119 overpass.

Gallery

See also
 Homestead strike of 1892
 Johnstown Flood of 1889
 Mammoth Mine disaster – January 27, 1891 gas explosion at Frick's coal mine in Mount Pleasant
 Murder of workers in labor disputes in the United States

References

External links 

 Simonich, Milan. 118 killed in 1891 Frick massacre and mine explosion to get markers. Pittsburgh Post Gazette. 24  September 2000. 
 Pulay, Emoke. The Shots Fired at Morewood. Mt. Pleasant Area Heritage Preservation Committee (Pa.). 1996. 140 pages.

1891 labor disputes and strikes
1891 in Pennsylvania
Miners' labor disputes in the United States
Labor disputes led by the United Mine Workers of America
Labor disputes in Pennsylvania